Juan Carlos Valenzuela Molina (born 21 December 1970 in Santa Rosa de Copán) is a Honduran politician. He currently serves as deputy of the National Congress of Honduras representing the National Party of Honduras for Lempira.

References

1970 births
Living people
People from Santa Rosa de Copan
National Party of Honduras politicians
Deputies of the National Congress of Honduras